PRCF may refer to:

People Resources and Conservation Foundation, a non-governmental conservation organization
Pôle de Renaissance Communiste en France, a political movement inspired by Marxism–Leninism